The 1980 LPGA Tour was the 31st season since the LPGA Tour officially began in 1950. The season ran from February 1 to November 9. The season consisted of 38 official money events. Donna Caponi and JoAnne Carner won the most tournaments, five each. Beth Daniel led the money list with earnings of $231,000.

There were five first-time winners in 1980: Barbara Barrow, Dot Germain, Dale Lundquist, Tatsuko Ohsako, and Donna White.

The tournament results and award winners are listed below.

Tournament results
The following table shows all the official money events for the 1980 season. "Date" is the ending date of the tournament. The numbers in parentheses after the winners' names are the number of wins they had on the tour up to and including that event. Majors are shown in bold.

^ - weather-shortened tournament

Awards

References

External links
LPGA Tour official site
1980 season coverage at golfobserver.com

LPGA Tour seasons
LPGA Tour